Tiger-BASIC is a high speed multitasking BASIC dialect (List of BASIC dialects) to program microcontrollers of the BASIC-Tiger family. Tiger-BASIC and the integrated development environment which goes with it, were developed by Wilke-Technology (Aachen, Germany).

External links
 Wilke-Technology

BASIC programming language
Embedded systems